The Paper and Packaging Board (P+PB), a commodity checkoff program overseen by the United States Department of Agriculture (USDA), is self-funded through quarterly assessments paid by eligible manufacturers and importers of paper and paper-based packaging. P+PB oversees the work of the Paper & Packaging – How Life Unfolds campaign designed to increase demand for paper and paper-based packaging.

Funds are used for informational, educational, and promotional activities in support of the industry’s products, and may not be used for advocacy or lobbying. The board was founded by order of the Secretary of Agriculture on January 22, 2014, after a referendum in which manufacturers and importers representing more than 95 percent of the industry’s total production volume voted in favor of its creation.

The Paper and Packaging Board (P+PB) is governed by a 12-member board elected from the participating companies and appointed by the Secretary of Agriculture. The Board is headquartered outside of Washington, DC in McLean, Virginia.

In July 2015, the Board launched the Paper & Packaging – How Life Unfolds campaign highlighting how paper and packaging’s functional and emotional benefits encourage creativity, warmth, learning and connection.

Notes

External links
Paper and Packaging Board
How Life Unfolds
United States Department of Agriculture

United States Department of Agriculture